Middleton Park is a rural park in the parish of Middleton Stoney, Oxfordshire, England, about  west of Bicester. The grounds are Grade II listed and include several historic buildings, notably a Grade I listed country house with Grade II* listed service wing and lodges.

History
The current house was designed by the English architect Edwin Lutyens and his son Robert for George Child Villiers, 9th Earl of Jersey. It was built in 1935–38 on the site of a mid-18th-century house that had been built for William Villiers, 3rd Earl of Jersey. It was Lutyens' last great country house. In 1974 it was converted into apartments. The estate is privately owned.

In the park east of the house are Middleton's Grade II* listed Norman parish church and the remains of a motte-and-bailey castle, which is a Scheduled Ancient Monument. The park also includes kitchen gardens, pleasure grounds, commercial woodland and the cricket ground belonging to Middleton Stoney Cricket Club.

References

Bibliography

External links

Country houses in Oxfordshire
Grade I listed houses in Oxfordshire
Grade II* listed buildings in Oxfordshire
Grade II listed garden and park buildings
Houses completed in 1938
Works of Edwin Lutyens in England